Indiana's 10th congressional district was a congressional district for the United States House of Representatives in Indiana.  It encompassed roughly the "Old City Limits" of Indianapolis from 1983-2003.  The district was re-drawn after the 1980 census and eliminated when Indiana's representation in the House of Representatives fell from 10 to nine after the 2000 Census.

Congresswoman Julia Carson, who formerly represented the 10th, was elected in 2002 to represent Indiana's 7th congressional district.  This district was redrawn to include the old 10th plus some new territory outside the old boundaries.  The old 7th district was absorbed as part of Indiana's 4th congressional district and Indiana's 8th congressional district in 2003.

From 1983-2003, the 10th had just two representatives, Congressman Andrew Jacobs Jr. and Congresswoman Julia Carson.  Carson was the second African-American to represent any part of Indiana in Congress. Katie Hall was the first, having represented Indiana's 1st congressional district, from  1982-1985.

List of members representing the district

References 

 Congressional Biographical Directory of the United States 1774–present

10
Former congressional districts of the United States
Government of Indianapolis
1843 establishments in Indiana
2003 disestablishments in Indiana
Constituencies established in 1843
Constituencies disestablished in 2003